Waddington railway station was a station in Waddington, Lincolnshire which opened on 15 April 1867 but closed for passengers on 10 September 1962 and for freight in 1964. The line through the station remained open until 1965.

The remaining buildings attributed to the Waddington Railway Station have been restored during the summer of 2010. These are located adjacent to the properties on Station Rd.

References

Disused railway stations in Lincolnshire
Former Great Northern Railway stations
Railway stations in Great Britain opened in 1867
Railway stations in Great Britain closed in 1962
1867 establishments in England
1962 disestablishments in England